Patrizio Billio (19 April 1974 – 23 January 2023) was an Italian footballer who played as a midfielder.

Biography
Billio was born in Treviso, Italy on 19 April 1974. He had a degree in Sports Management from the Catholic University of Milan.

Career
Billio started his professional career at A.C. Milan, playing with the youth academy before being promoted to the senior squad. He then played for Ravenna, Verona (both Serie B), Casarano (Serie C1), Ternana (Serie C2), Ancona.

In January 1998, he joined Crystal Palace in the Premier League, making his debut as a substitute in a win against Newcastle United at St James' Park. Billio then played for Ancona for a short period of time before signing with Dundee in October 1999. After excellent performances, the club renewed for three more seasons. Not long after, however, he and fellow Italian player Marco De Marchi had major conflicts with the new management, most notably manager Ivano Bonetti. They were removed unfairly from the first team and within a few months were required to practice alone or with the youth team. In January 2002, Billio alleged that he was headbutted by a man with a skinhead haircut outside of Dens Park and that his car was stolen from his home. There was speculation about whether Dundee executive Paul Marr had been involved in the attack, but he was later acquitted in court. FIFA decided to release him from his contract shortly thereafter and was signed by Aberdeen on a free transfer in August 2002. He scored his first goal for the club in a 3–1 win over Dunfermline. He decided to leave Aberdeen  in December 2002, and he signed for Livorno of Serie B.

He then played for Sora (Serie C1, 2003–04, 2004-5 January), Pro Sesto (January 2005 – 2006, Serie C1 &C2) and Massese (Serie C1). He returned to Pro Sesto in 2008 Serie C1 and successively returned to Tuscany in January 2009 to join Lega Pro Seconda Divisione club Colligiana, where he finished his career.

Retirement
Following his retirement in 2011, Billio joined the LOYAC AC Milan Soccer School in Kuwait as the technical director and head coach. He had expressed interest in opening an AC Milan Soccer School arm in Dundee.

Death
Billio died from a heart attack on 23 January 2023, at the age of 48.

References

External links

2005-06 Profile at footballplus.com
 Profile at massesecalcio.it
Curriculum Giocatore 

1974 births
2023 deaths
Sportspeople from the Province of Treviso
Italian footballers
Footballers from Veneto
Association football midfielders
Serie B players
Premier League players
Scottish Premier League players
A.C. Milan players
Ravenna F.C. players
Hellas Verona F.C. players
Ternana Calcio players
A.C. Monza players
Crystal Palace F.C. players
A.C. Ancona players
Dundee F.C. players
Aberdeen F.C. players
U.S. Livorno 1915 players
S.S.D. Pro Sesto players
U.S. Massese 1919 players
A.S.D. Olimpia Colligiana players
Italian expatriate footballers
Italian expatriate sportspeople in England
Expatriate footballers in England
Italian expatriate sportspeople in Scotland
Expatriate footballers in Scotland